Mate Bulić (born 18 February 1957) is a Herzegovinian Croat pop and folk singer, whose songs are influenced by his native Herzegovina region of Bosnia and Herzegovina. Since 1990s, he has been living and performing from Frankfurt, Germany, where he became known as the "King of the Diaspora".

Biography
Bulić finished his schooling in Čitluk and at Mostar, graduating in electrical engineering. However, he decided not to pursue a teaching job in Mostar and moved to Frankfurt where he married and started a family. It was not until later that he began to develop his music career. It was not until the early 1990s that he began recording, and in 1994 his first album was released. He is known for using numerous elements of traditional Croatian music which he incorporates into his music, such as the use of the lijerica and the singing of ganga. He has collaborated with many Croatian artists, most notably Miroslav Škoro and Marko Perković.

Albums
 Gdje ste noćas prijatelji stari (1994)
 Dodijalo pajdo (1997)
 Hrvatske narodne pjesme (1998)
 Pjevajte sa mnom (1999)
 Sve najbolje (2001)
 Gori borovina (2003)
 Megamix (2004)
 Kako mi je, tako mi je (2007)
 Domu mom (2011)
 Sretan Božić, moj narode (2017)

References

External links
  

1957 births
Living people
People from Čitluk, Bosnia and Herzegovina
Bosnia and Herzegovina folk-pop singers
German folk singers
Croats of Bosnia and Herzegovina